NF-kappa-B essential modulator (NEMO) also known as inhibitor of nuclear factor kappa-B kinase subunit gamma (IKK-γ) is a protein that in humans is encoded by the IKBKG gene. NEMO is a subunit of the IκB kinase complex that activates NF-κB.  The human gene for IKBKG is located on chromosome Xq28. Multiple transcript variants encoding different isoforms have been found for this gene.

Function 

NEMO (IKK-γ) is the regulatory subunit of the inhibitor of IκB kinase (IKK) complex, which activates NF-κB resulting in activation of genes involved in inflammation, immunity, cell survival, and other pathways.

Clinical significance 

Mutations in the IKBKG  gene results in incontinentia pigmenti, hypohidrotic ectodermal dysplasia, and several other types of immunodeficiencies.

Incontinentia Pigmenti (IP) is an X-linked dominant disease caused by a mutation in the IKBKG gene.  Since IKBKG helps activate NF-κB, which protects cells against TNF-alpha induced apoptosis, a lack of IKBKG (and hence a lack of active NF-κB) makes cells more prone to apoptosis.

Moreover, NEMO has been shown to play a role in preeclampsia and may offer insights into the genetic etiology of this condition. An increased level of NEMO gene expression was found in the blood of pregnant women with preeclampsia and their children. However, a decrease of the mRNA levels of total NEMO and the transcripts 1A, 1B, and 1C in placentas derived from preeclamptic women may be the main reason for intensified apoptosis. Sanger sequencing has indicated two distinct variations in the 3’ UTR region of the NEMO gene in preeclamptic women (IKBKG:c.*368C>A and IKBKG:c.*402C>T). The occurrence of a maternal TT genotype and either a TT genotype in the daughter or T allele in the son increases the risk of preeclampsia by 2.59 fold. The configuration of those maternal and fetal genotypes (TT mother/TT daughter or TT mother/T son) is also associated with the level of NEMO gene expression.

NEMO deficiency syndrome is a rare genetic condition relating to a fault in IKBKG.  It mostly affects males and has a highly variable set of symptoms and prognoses.

As a drug target 

A drug called NEMO Binding Domain (NBD) has been designed to inhibit activation of NF-κB. NBD is a  peptide that acts by binding to regulatory subunit NEMO (IKK-γ) thereby preventing it from binding subunits IKK-α and IKK-β and activating the IKK complex. In the absence of regulatory subunit IKK-γ the IKK complex is inactive, preventing the downstream signal transduction cascade leading to NF-κB activation. Binding of IKK-γ to IKK-α and IKK-β subunits activates the IKK complex leading to phosphorylation of IκB kinase, IκBα, and release of NF-κB dimers p105 and RELA to translocate to the nucleus and activate transcription of NF-κB responsive genes. In the presence of the NBD peptide, the IKK complex remains inactive and IκBα sequesters NF-κB dimers in the cytoplasm inhibiting transcription of NF-κB responsive genes. While NF-κB inhibitory drugs have previously been attractive to disease such as chronic inflammation and diabetes, specific cancers have been shown to have constitutive NF-κB activity. Advanced B-cell lymphoma (ABC), a subtype of Diffuse large B-cell lymphoma (DLBCL)  has been shown to have fundamental and upregulated NF-κB activity. ABC lymphoma also has the lowest survival rate compared to DLBCL subtypes, Germinal Center B-cell-like and Undefined Type 3 lymphoma, highlighting the great clinical need to define targets for cancer therapy. Notably, the NBD peptide targets the inflammation induced NF-κB activation pathway sparing the protective functions of basal NF-κB activity allowing for greater therapeutic value and fewer undesired side effects.

The NBD peptide was designed by identifying the amino acid binding sequence on IKK-α and IKK-β to which NEMO binds. A small region on the carboxyl terminus of IKK-α (L738-L743) and IKK-β (L737-L742) is essential for a stable interaction with NEMO and for the assembly of the active IKK complex. Henceforth this region is called the NEMO binding domain (NBD).  The NBD peptide consists of the region from T735 to E745 of the IKK-β subunit fused with a sequence derived from the Antennapedia homeodomain that mediates membrane translocation. Furthermore, wild type NBD peptide has been shown to dose-dependently inhibit interaction of IKKB with NEMO compared to mutant controls. Additionally, NF-κB activation was suppressed in HeLa cells after incubation with NBD wild type peptides. Moreover, to better understand the potential efficacy of the NBD peptide in suppressing inflammation, NBD peptide was tested on collagen induced rheumatoid arthritis mouse models. Notably, aberrant NF-κB activity is strongly associated with many aspects of the pathology of rheumatoid arthritis. Mice injected with wild-type NBD peptide showed only slightly visual signs of paw and joint swelling whereas mice injected with PBS or mutant NBD control peptides developed severe joint inflammation.  Additionally, analysis of the number of osteoclasts present in the joints of rheumatoid arthritic showed to be more prevalent in mice treated with PBS or the mutant NBD peptide compared to the NBD wild type peptide. Markedly, throughout the mouse model studies neither toxicity or lethality nor damage to kidneys or livers, was observed.

Despite the potential for NBD peptide as a viable NF- κB inhibitory drug, disadvantages arise because of its peptide form. Peptides as drugs lack membrane permeability, are poorly orally viable, and generally have lower metabolic stability than small molecule drugs. Therefore, the NBD peptide is unable to be an orally available compound and must be administered either intravenously or via intraperitoneal injection.

Interactions 
IKBKG has been shown to interact with:

 BCL10, 
 CDC37, 
 CHUK and 
 IKK2, 
 IRAK1, 
 NCOA3, 
 PPM1B, 
 TANK,
 TNFAIP3, 
 TRAF3IP2,  and
 TRAF6.

References

Further reading

External links 
 
  GeneReviews/NIH/NCBI/UW entry on Incontinentia Pigmenti
 OMIM IKBKG
  GeneReviews/NCBI/NIH/UW entry on Anophthalmia / Microphthalmia Overview

Proteins
EC 2.7.11